is a Japanese adult video company located in Tokyo, Japan.

Company information
TMA, founded in October 1990, has offices located within Tokyo's Toshima ward. The studio specializes in videos generally in the cosplay genre but they are especially noted for making porn-parodies based on famous manga and anime series such as The Melancholy of Haruhi Suzumiya, Lucky Star, Neon Genesis Evangelion, and K-On!.

TMA has been one of the pioneer companies in exploring new media for adult videos. In 2005, they were one of the first studios, along with Glay'z and h.m.p., to produce adult material for the UMD format used on the PlayStation Portable with their August 12, 2005 release of three videos including , coded TPS-001. Two years later in 2007, when Sony's Blu-ray format was still in competition with the rival HD DVD format, with some technical assistance from Sony, TMA was one of the first Japanese AV companies to release videos in the Blu-ray format. In a July 2007 article, Yoshimasa Nozu, a producer at TMA said the company planned to release at least one Blu-ray disc per month for the rest of the year.

The studio produces about 16 new videos per month and in September 2011, the Hokuto Corporation's commercial website DMM listed over 1250 DVD titles available under the TMA company name.

AV Grand Prix
TMA was one of the companies which submitted videos for the 2008 AV Grand Prix competition. Their entry, labeled AVGP-020, was a futanari genre work starring Miyu Hoshino, Ryo Kiyohara, Reina Mizuki and Nana Mizuki. TMA also entered the 2009 AV Grand Prix contest with a video, labeled AVGP-131, which featured non-Japanese actresses.

Labels
In addition to TMA, the company has used the following labels for its videos:
 Expotion
 Mizuiro
 TMA Works

Actresses
Some of the actresses who have appeared in TMA videos:

 Hotaru Akane
 Bunko Kanazawa
 Yua Kisaki
 Sakurako Kaoru
 Yuria Kato
 Marina Matsushima
 Momoka Nishina
 Anna Ohura
 Nao Oikawa
 Maria Ozawa
 Riko Tachibana
 Tsubomi

Series
Video series produced by TMA include:
 Molester Bus
 Swimsuit Lovers

References

External link 
 Official homepage (Japanese) [cannot be viewed by foreigners]

Japanese pornographic film studios
Mass media companies established in 1990
Mass media companies based in Tokyo
Japanese companies established in 1990
Film production companies of Japan